The Alexander Technique, named after its developer Frederick Matthias Alexander (1869–1955), is a type of  alternative therapy based on the idea that poor posture gives rise to a range of health problems. The American National Center for Complementary and Integrative Health classifies it as a "psychological and physical" complementary approach to health when used "together with" mainstream methods. When used "in place of" conventional medicine, it's considered "alternative".

Alexander began developing his technique's principles in the 1890s in an attempt to address his own voice loss during public speaking. He credited his method with allowing him to pursue his passion for performing Shakespearean recitations.

Proponents and teachers of the Alexander Technique believe the technique can address a variety of health conditions, but there is a lack of research to support the claims. , the UK National Health Service cites evidence which suggests that the Alexander Technique may be helpful for long-term back pain and for long-term neck pain, and that it could help people cope with Parkinson's disease. Both the American health-insurance company Aetna and the Australian Department of Health have conducted reviews and concluded that there is insufficient evidence for the technique's health claims to warrant insurance coverage.

Method 

The Alexander Technique is most commonly taught in a series of private lessons which may last from 30 minutes to an hour. The number of lessons varies widely, depending on the student's needs and level of interest. Students are often performers, such as actors, dancers, musicians, athletes and public speakers, people who work on computers, or those who are in frequent pain for other reasons. Instructors observe their students, and provide both verbal and gentle manual guidance to help students learn how to move with better poise and less strain. Sessions include chair work – often in front of a mirror – during which the instructor will guide the student while the student stands, sits and walks, learning to move efficiently while maintaining a comfortable relationship between the head, neck, and spine, and table work or physical manipulation.

In the United Kingdom, there is no regulation for who can offer Alexander Technique services. Professional organisations do exist, however, typically offering 3 year courses to people becoming instructors.

History

The Alexander Technique is based on the personal observations of Frederick Matthias Alexander (1869–1955). Alexander's career as an actor was hampered by recurrent bouts of laryngitis, but he found he could overcome it by focusing on his discomfort and tension, and relaxing. Alexander also thought posture could be improved if one became more conscious of one's own bodily movement. 

While on a recital tour in New Zealand (1895), Alexander came to believe in the wider significance of improved carriage for overall physical functioning, although evidence from his own publications appears to indicate it happened less systematically and over a long period of time.

Alexander did not originally conceive of his technique as therapy, but it has become a form of alternative medicine.

When considering how to classify the Alexander Technique in relation to mainstream medicine, some sources describe it as alternative and/or complementary, depending on whether it is used alone or with mainstream methods. The American National Center for Complementary and Integrative Health classifies it as a "psychological and physical" complementary approach to health when used with mainstream methods. When used "in place of" conventional medicine, it's considered "alternative".

Influence

The American philosopher and educator John Dewey became impressed with the Alexander Technique after his headaches, neck pains, blurred vision, and stress symptoms largely improved during the time he used Alexander's advice to change his posture. In 1923, Dewey wrote the introduction to Alexander's Constructive Conscious Control of the Individual.

Fritz Perls, who originated Gestalt therapy, credited Alexander as an inspiration for his psychological work.

Uses

The Alexander Technique is used as a therapy for stress-related chronic conditions. It does not attempt to cure the underlying cause, but to teach people how to avoid bad habits which might exacerbate their condition.

The Technique is used as an alternative treatment to improve both voice and posture for people in the performing arts.  it was on the curriculum of prominent Western performing arts institutions.

According to Alexander Technique instructor Michael J. Gelb, people tend to study the Alexander Technique for reasons of personal development.

Health effects

The UK National Health Service says that advocates of the Alexander Technique made claims for it that were not supported by evidence, but that there was evidence suggesting that it might help with chronic back or neck pain, and Parkinson disease. There was limited evidence for chronic pain, stammering, and balance skills in older people. There was no good evidence of benefit for other conditions including asthma, headaches, osteoarthritis, difficulty sleeping, and stress."

A review published in BMC Complementary and Alternative Medicine in 2014 focused on "the evidence for the effectiveness of AT sessions on musicians' performance, anxiety, respiratory function and posture" concluded that "evidence from RCTs and CTs suggests that AT sessions may improve performance anxiety in musicians. Effects on music performance, respiratory function and posture yet remain inconclusive."

A 2012 Cochrane systematic review found that there is no good evidence that the Alexander Technique is effective for treating asthma, and randomized clinical trials are needed in order to assess the effectiveness of this type of treatment approach.

A review by Aetna last updated in 2021 stated: "Aetna considers the following alternative medicine interventions experimental and investigational because there is inadequate evidence in the peer-reviewed published medical literature of their effectiveness." The Alexander Technique is included in that list.

A 2015 review, conducted for the Australian Department of Health in order to determine what services the Australian government should pay for, examined clinical trials published to date and found that "overall, the evidence was limited by the small number of participants in the intervention arms, wide confidence intervals or a lack of replication of results."  It concluded that "the Alexander Technique may improve short-term pain and disability in people with low back pain, but the longer-term effects remain uncertain. For all other clinical conditions, the effectiveness of the Alexander Technique was deemed to be uncertain, due to insufficient evidence."  It also noted that "evidence for the safety of Alexander Technique was lacking, with most trials not reporting on this outcome." Subsequently in 2017, the Australian government named the Alexander Technique as a practice that would not qualify for insurance subsidy, saying this step would "ensure taxpayer funds are expended appropriately and not directed to therapies lacking evidence".

See also

 Nikolai Bernstein
 George E. Coghill
 Motor skill consolidation
 Neutral spine
 Psychomotor learning

References

External links

Mind–body interventions
Postural awareness techniques
Somatics